Yesterday is a 2004 South African drama film written and directed by Darrell Roodt. It was nominated for the Best Foreign Language Film category at the 77th Academy Awards. It also won Best Sound and Best Editing at the inaugural edition of the Africa Movie Academy Awards. The film tells a story of a young mother, Yesterday (Leleti Khumalo), who discovers she has AIDS. Her husband, a migrant mine laborer, rejected her despite being the one that infected her. Her ambition becomes to live long enough to see her daughter, Beauty, go to school. This film is the first commercial feature-length production in Zulu.

Credited cast 
Kenneth Khambula as John Khumalo, Yesterday's husband
Leleti Khumalo as Yesterday
Harriet Lenabe as Teacher
Lihle Mvelase as Beauty
Camilla Walker as The female doctor

Plot 
Yesterday is a Zulu mother living with her seven-year-old daughter, Beauty, in their rural village of Rooihoek (English translation means literally "red corner"), in Zululand, South Africa. Every day of her life is spent in the hard work of tilling the field to plant enough food for them, fetching water, cutting firewood and hauling it home, all while also trying to keep her daughter stimulated and occupied. She strikes up a friendship with the new teacher who arrives in the village.

Yesterday is plagued by a persistent cough and feelings of weakness. She goes to the local clinic, which is an extremely long walk for her and Beauty. She waits all day in the long queue to see the doctor, only to be turned away at the end of the day without having seen the doctor. She brushes it off, saying that she is not that ill. When Beauty finds her mother collapsed on the doorstep of their home, she runs to call her mother's friend, the teacher. Yesterday consults a traditional healer, but her teacher friend insists she return to the clinic. The teacher pays for a taxi to the clinic so that she can get there early enough to see the doctor; the teacher also takes care of Beauty for the day. The doctor who sees Yesterday asks her where she got her name from, and Yesterday explains that her father named her Yesterday because, "He said things were better yesterday than today." The doctor tells Yesterday that her illness is AIDS-related and that she probably got it from her husband, who is away working in a mine. After hearing the news, Yesterday is very upset. Yesterday understands that she will die from this disease, leaving her daughter alone.

She makes a plan to travel to the mine where her husband, John, works to tell him the news and to tell him that he also is sick. He reacts to this news very badly and beats her, while his supervisor looks in and then looks away. Yesterday goes home and tries to continue living her life as best she can. She asks her teacher friend to take care of Beauty when she dies. A few months later John comes home to her. He is very ill from AIDS-related illnesses and begs Yesterday's forgiveness for blaming her and for beating her for telling him the truth. He explains that he has been fired from the mine, as he is now incontinent and there are no toilets down in the mine, so all day he would stink "like an animal". The other villagers, who do not understand HIV/AIDS, protest at having John living amongst them and say that he must leave or go to hospital. Yesterday tried to get her husband into a nearby clinic but was unsuccessful, as there were no available beds for him and he would need to be put on a waiting list. Due to this, she sets out to make her own hospital on a nearby hill. Using sheet metal and pieces of old cars and taxis, she puts together a building, which she then helps her husband to with her daughter's assistance.

As they are making the laborious journey to the "hospital", John comments that when he was young he could run from one end of this field to the other and not think of it, now it seems like the longest journey of his life. Yesterday and Beauty take care of him as well as they can until he dies. Yesterday's focus then falls on preparing Beauty for school. Yesterday never went to school, so her single goal becomes living long enough to be able to see Beauty attend. When the doctor tells her she has a strong body that keeps the illness somewhat under control she replies it's not the body but her mind. Yesterday watches as her daughter starts her first day at school and then walks off as the camera pans back from her.

Awards 
 "Best Film" at the 3rd Pune International Film Festival in India.
 "Inaugural Human Rights Film Award" at the 2004 Venice Film Festival.
 Awards for "Best Sound", "Best Make Up" and "Best Editing" at the 2005 African Movie Academy Awards
 Nominated for Best Foreign Language Film at the 77th Academy Awards.
 Nominated for Outstanding Made for Television movie at the 2006 Primetime Emmy Awards
Won a Peabody Award in 2005

References

External links 
Official site

 Movies Yesterday

2004 television films
2004 films
2004 drama films
Films set in South Africa
Zulu-language films
Films directed by Darrell Roodt
HIV/AIDS in film
HBO Films films
Best Sound Africa Movie Academy Award winners
Best Editing Africa Movie Academy Award winners
Peabody Award-winning broadcasts
South African drama films